Paula Mollenhauer (December 22, 1908 – July 7, 1988) was a German athlete who won the bronze medal in the discus throw event at the 1936 Summer Olympics held in Berlin, Germany. She was born and died in Hamburg and she also won the bronze medal in the discus throw event at the 1938 European Athletics Championships in Vienna.

References 
 Sports-reference.com

1908 births
1988 deaths
German female discus throwers
Olympic bronze medalists for Germany
Athletes (track and field) at the 1928 Summer Olympics
Athletes (track and field) at the 1936 Summer Olympics
Olympic athletes of Germany
Athletes from Hamburg
European Athletics Championships medalists
Medalists at the 1936 Summer Olympics
Olympic bronze medalists in athletics (track and field)